Throughout the history of Running Man, special series have progressed with storytelling and movie-like episodes. Many of these series have been praised for their thrill and excitement, and are considered some of the more higher quality episodes of Running Man.

Special series

Yoo-mes Bond
The Yoo-mes Bond series is famous for its protagonist, Yoo Jae-suk as Yoo-mes Bond, who is known to use a water gun to eliminate his foes to complete his missions. This series features Yoo Jae-suk against the other Running Man members, who do not know Yoo Jae-suk's identity or mission. At the end of both episodes 91 and 140, the words "Yoo-mes Bond Never Die" appeared, hinting at future episodes in the series. These two episodes have been praised for being like a movie instead of a variety show.

Best of the Best Match
The "Best of the Best Matches" take place once in a while as the opportunity to decide who is the best "Running Man".

Running Man-Grasshopper Hunting
"Running Man Hunter" is an epithet given to Choi Min-soo who is tasked to eliminate the Running Man members. There is a rivalry between him and Yoo Jae-suk, who betrayed him during his first attempt in the mission. Since then, he had return to appear in the program to hunt the members and always leave Yoo Jae-suk to be the last surviving member.

At the end of the episode 118, Choi Min-soo hinted at a possible return to the Running Man Hunter series in the future.

Running Man Olympics
The Running Man members competes with guests and each other in order to win the "Olympic" battle.

Running Man Football
The Running Man members were given a chance to participate in charity football matches alongside Park Ji-sung. Each year, the members would participate in training missions with Park Ji-sung to prepare for the football game prior to the match.

Fan-based episodes
Aside from the episodes created by the team, the Running Man members undergo challenges suggested by fans or made by the team through their fans' ideas.

Tru-Gary Show
Gary, who is gullible and unable to lie, has been asking the production staff to give him a spy mission. However, when the production staff decided to give him the mission, they decided to trick him and created hidden camera episodes instead.

References

Lists of Running Man (TV series) episodes